Lisovo is a village in the municipality of Svilengrad, in Haskovo Province, in southern Bulgaria.
The village had 3 inhabitants, all of whom are ethnic Roma.

References

Villages in Haskovo Province